Peksater (Pekerslo) was a Nubian queen dated to the Twenty-fifth Dynasty of Egypt.

Biography
Peksater was the daughter of King Kashta and Queen Pebatjma. She appears with her husband Piye in a relief in the Amun Temple at Barkal. Piye is dressed as a high priest and officiates before the barque of Amun. Laming and Macadam suggest she was an adopted daughter of Pebatjma.

Peksater was buried in Abydos, Egypt. Parts of a lintel, three doorjambs and a stela were found. Here she is called king's daughter, king's wife and great king's wife.

References

8th-century BC Egyptian women
Queens consort of the Twenty-fifth Dynasty of Egypt
8th-century BC Egyptian people